Robert William Hoskins (26 October 1942 – 29 April 2014) was an English actor. His work included lead roles in films and television series such as Pennies from Heaven (1978), The Long Good Friday (1980), Mona Lisa (1986), Who Framed Roger Rabbit (1988), Mermaids (1990), Super Mario Bros. (1993), and Balto (1995), and supporting performances in  The Cotton Club (1984), Brazil (1985), Hook (1991), Nixon (1995), Enemy at the Gates (2001), Maid in Manhattan (2002), Mrs Henderson Presents (2005), A Christmas Carol (2009), Made in Dagenham (2010), and Snow White and the Huntsman (2012). He also directed two feature films: The Raggedy Rawney (1988) and Rainbow (1996).

Hoskins received the Best Actor Award at the Cannes Film Festival, the BAFTA Award for Best Actor in a Leading Role and the Golden Globe Award for Best Actor – Motion Picture Drama for his role in Mona Lisa. He was also nominated for the Academy Award for Best Actor for the same role. In 2009, he won an International Emmy Award for Best Actor for his appearance on the BBC One drama The Street. He retired from acting in 2012 owing to Parkinson's disease, with which he had been diagnosed the previous year, and died from pneumonia on 29 April 2014 at the age of 71.

Early life 
Robert William Hoskins was born in Bury St Edmunds on 26 October 1942, the son of Elsie (née Hopkins), a cook and nursery school teacher, and Robert Hoskins, a bookkeeper and lorry driver. One of his grandmothers was Romani. From two weeks old, he was brought up in the Finsbury Park area of London. He attended Stroud Green Secondary School, where he was written off as "stupid" on account of his dyslexia. He left school at 15 with a single O-Level and worked as a porter, lorry driver, plumber,  and window cleaner. He started but did not complete a three-year accountancy course. He spent six months on a kibbutz in Israel and two years tending to the camels of a Bedouin tribe in Syria.

Career 

Hoskins's acting career began in 1968 at the Victoria Theatre in Stoke-on-Trent, in a production of Romeo and Juliet in which he played a servant named Peter. A year later, while waiting in the bar at Unity Theatre, London, for his friend the actor Roger Frost, Hoskins found himself being auditioned for a play after being handed a script and told, "You're next." His audition was successful and Frost became his understudy. Frost considered Hoskins "a natural", recalling that "he just got up on stage and was brilliant".

In late 1969, he was part of Bolton's Octagon Theatre outreach troupe, which became the Ken Campbell Roadshow.

Hoskins's London theatre career included portraying a "vigorous" Alfred Doolittle in a West End production of Bernard Shaw's Pygmalion opposite Diana Rigg at the Albery Theatre in 1974, and in a Royal Shakespeare Company production of Eugene O'Neill's The Iceman Cometh at the Aldwych Theatre in 1976 as Rocky the bartender, opposite Patrick Stewart. In 1981, he starred with Helen Mirren in The Duchess of Malfi at the Royal Exchange Theatre, Manchester and the London Roundhouse.

His first major television role was in On the Move (1975–1976), an educational drama series directed by Barbara Derkow aimed at tackling adult illiteracy. He portrayed the character Alf Hunt, a removal man who had problems reading and writing. According to producer George Auckland, up to 17 million people watched the series. His breakthrough in television came later in the original BBC version of Dennis Potter's 6-part drama Pennies from Heaven (1978), in which he portrayed adulterous sheet music salesman Arthur Parker. He later played Iago (opposite Anthony Hopkins) in Jonathan Miller's BBC Television Shakespeare production of Othello (1981). In 1983, Hoskins voiced an advert for Weetabix and, during the late 1980s and early 1990s, he appeared in advertising for British Gas and British Telecom (now BT Group). Other television work included Flickers, portraying Wilkins Micawber in David Copperfield (1999) and The Wind in the Willows (2006).

British films such as The Long Good Friday (1980) and Mona Lisa (1986) won him the wider approval of critics, the latter film winning him a Cannes Award, Best Actor Golden Globe, BAFTA Awards and an Academy Award nomination for Best Actor.

Other film parts included Spoor in Terry Gilliam's Brazil (1985), Smee in Hook (1991) and in Neverland (2011), starring opposite Cher in Mermaids (1990), portraying Nikita Khrushchev as a political commissar in Enemy at the Gates (2001) and playing Uncle Bart, the violent psychopathic "owner" of Jet Li in Unleashed (2005, aka Danny The Dog). He had a small role as the protagonist's rock and roll manager in The Wall (1982) and, in 1997, had a cameo as Ginger Spice's disguise in the Spice Girls' film, Spice World. He directed two films that he also starred in: The Raggedy Rawney (1988) and Rainbow (1996), and produced Mrs Henderson Presents alongside Norma Heyman, for which he was nominated as Golden Globe Best Supporting Actor for his performance in the film.

A high point in his career was portraying the private investigator Edward "Eddie" Valiant in the live-action/animated family blockbuster, Who Framed Roger Rabbit (1988). Hoskins was not the first choice for the role – Harrison Ford, Bill Murray and Eddie Murphy were all considered for the part. Film critics, among them Gene Siskel and Roger Ebert, agreed that Hoskins was perfect for the role. As his character interacts and makes physical contact with animated characters in the film, Hoskins was required to take mime training courses in preparation. He experienced hallucinations for months after production on the film had ended. He was nominated for a Golden Globe Award and won a British Evening Standard Award for his performance.

Hoskins's portrayal of the Los Angeles investigator Valiant was one of several roles where he used an American accent; he was described by Trey Barrineau of USA Today as having "a knack for playing Americans better than most American actors could". Others included Rocky the bartender in the play The Iceman Cometh (1976); gangster Owney Madden in Francis Coppola's The Cotton Club (1984); Gus Klein in Wolfgang Petersen's Shattered (1991); J. Edgar Hoover in Oliver Stone's Nixon (1995); and Eddie Mannix in Hollywoodland (2006). He was slated to be the last-minute replacement in case Robert De Niro refused the role of Al Capone in The Untouchables (1987). When De Niro accepted the part, the director Brian De Palma mailed Hoskins a cheque for $200,000 with a "Thank You" note: Hoskins called De Palma to ask if there were any more films he was not needed for.

In a 1988 interview with Fresh Air Terry Gross, when asked about many of his roles being underworld types, Hoskins said, "I think if you've got a face like mine you don't usually wind up with the parts that Errol Flynn played, you know?"

He told The Guardian in 2007 that he regretted starring as Mario in Super Mario Bros. (1993), saying that he was extremely unhappy with the film, greatly angered by his experiences making it, and referring to it as the "worst thing I ever did". He was injured several times on set, spent most of the time with co-star John Leguizamo getting drunk to escape boredom, and was not aware that the film was based on a video game until he was informed later by his son.

In 2007, Hoskins appeared in the music video for Jamie T's single "Sheila". In 2009, he returned to television for Jimmy McGovern's drama serial The Street, playing a publican who opposes a local gangster. For this role, he received his only Emmy: Best Actor at the 2010 International Emmys. The 2011 film In Search of La Che features a character "Wermit," whose every line of dialogue is a quote from Bob Hoskins.

On 8 August 2012, Hoskins announced his retirement from acting, having been diagnosed with Parkinson's disease in 2011.

Personal life 
When asked in an interview which living person he most despised, Hoskins named Tony Blair and said, "He's done even more damage than Thatcher." He hated Blair to the point that he decided in 2010, for the first time in his life, not to vote for Labour, by then led by Gordon Brown.

Hoskins often made light of his similarities with film actor Danny DeVito, who he joked would play him in a film about his life.

With his first wife Jane Livesey, Hoskins had two children: Alex (born 1968) and Sarah (born 1972). With his second wife, Linda Banwell, he had two more children: Rosa (born ) and Jack (born ). Hoskins divided his time between the Hampstead area of London and Chiddingly, East Sussex.

Later in life, Hoskins gave up drinking alcohol. He said that his wife persuaded him to go sober.

Illness and death 

Hoskins was diagnosed with Parkinson's disease in 2011. He subsequently retired from acting in August 2012.

On 29 April 2014, he died of pneumonia at a London hospital, aged 71. He was survived by his wife Linda and his four children.

Among actors who paid tribute at his funeral were Stephen Fry, Samuel L. Jackson and Helen Mirren, who said that "London will miss one of her best and most loving sons." Hoskins is buried in Highgate Cemetery in London.

Filmography

Film

Television

References

Bibliography

External links 

 

1942 births
2014 deaths
20th-century English male actors
21st-century English male actors
Audiobook narrators
Best Actor BAFTA Award winners
Best Actor Genie and Canadian Screen Award winners
Best Drama Actor Golden Globe (film) winners
British male film actors
Burials at Highgate Cemetery
Cannes Film Festival Award for Best Actor winners
Critics' Circle Theatre Award winners
Deaths from pneumonia in England
English male film actors
English male television actors
English male voice actors
English Romani people
European Film Award for Best Actor winners
International Emmy Award for Best Actor winners
People from Finsbury Park
People from Hornsey
Actors with dyslexia
People with Parkinson's disease
Romani male actors